Artemy, sometimes romanized as Artemiy, Artemi, or Artemij, is a full unique form of the Russian short male Artyom.

Artemy Lebedev, Russian web designer
Artemi Panarin, Russian hockey player
Artemy Vedel, Russian composer
Saint Artemy, in the Russian Orthodox Church:
Artemy of Verkola
Artemius
Artemas of Lystra

Masculine given names
Russian masculine given names